Scrobipalpa diversa is a moth in the family Gelechiidae. It was described by Anthonie Johannes Theodorus Janse in 1950. It is found in Namibia.

References

Endemic fauna of Namibia
Scrobipalpa
Moths described in 1950